Schiena is the third album by Italian singer Emma, released in 2013. On 12 November 2013, Schiena vs Schiena, a special two-disc edition of the album, was released. The second disc comprises semi-acoustic versions of all songs on the original album. On 5 May 2014, the international edition of Schiena was released. The single, "La Mia Città", which is available on both the international and Schiena vs Schiena editions of the album, was the Italian entry for the Eurovision Song Contest 2014 in Copenhagen, Denmark. In May 2014, the album went triple platinum.

Track listing

Charts

References

2013 albums
Emma Marrone albums